Sefid Sang Rural District is a rural district (dehestan) in Qalandarabad District, Fariman County, Razavi Khorasan Province, Iran. At the 2006 census, its population was 2,725, in 627 families.  The rural district has 17 villages.

References 

Rural Districts of Razavi Khorasan Province
Fariman County